Dunya is an Arabic word referring to the temporal world.

Dunya may also refer to:

Arts and entertainment
Dunya (album), by Nazeel Azami, 2006
 Dunya, a fictional character in "The Station Master", a short story from Pushkin's The Belkin Tales
 Dunya, a fictional character in Dostoevsky's Crime and Punishment

Media
Dünya (newspaper), a Turkish newspaper
Dunya News, a current affairs TV channel in Pakistan
Daily Dunya, a newspaper in Pakistan

People
Ibn Abi al-Dunya (823–894), a Muslim scholar
Dunya Maumoon, Maldives politician and government minister
Dunya Mikhail (born 1965), Iraqi-American poet

Other uses
Dunya University of Afghanistan 
Bassarona dunya, or great marquis, a butterfly

See also

Dunia (disambiguation)
Duniya (disambiguation)
Dunja (disambiguation)
Donya (disambiguation)